The following is a list of notable deaths in October 2013.

Entries for each day are listed alphabetically by surname. A typical entry lists information in the following sequence:
Name, age, country of citizenship and reason for notability, established cause of death, reference.

October 2013

1
Rosemary Adey, 80, Australian softball player.
Peter Broadbent, 80, English footballer, Alzheimer's disease.
Arnold Burns, 83, American lawyer, Deputy Attorney General (1986–1988), cardiac arrest and complications from Parkinson's disease.
Ellis Burton, 77, American baseball player (St. Louis Cardinals, Cleveland Indians, Chicago Cubs).
Tom Clancy, 66, American author (The Hunt for Red October, Patriot Games, Rainbow Six), heart failure.
John B. Duff, 82, American historian and academic administrator, president of Columbia College Chicago (1992–2000), Alzheimer's disease.
Imero Fiorentino, 85, American lighting designer.
Giuliano Gemma, 75, Italian actor, traffic collision.
Marshall Lee Gore, 50, American murderer and rapist, execution by lethal injection.
Israel Gutman, 90, Israeli historian.
Arnold Lazarus, 81, South African psychologist.
Juan José Linz, 87, Spanish sociologist.
Silvino Silvério Marques, 95, Portuguese colonial administrator and a general of the Portuguese Army.
Vladimir Miklyukov, 69, Russian mathematician.
Ole Danbolt Mjøs, 74, Norwegian physician and politician, chairman of the Norwegian Nobel Committee (2003–2008).
Martin O'Toole, 88, Irish politician, Senator (1977–1989), TD for Mayo West (1989–1992).
Jim Rountree, 77, American CFL football player (Toronto Argonauts), cancer.

2
Shun Akiyama, 83, Japanese literary critic, esophageal cancer.
Benjamin Dwomoh, 78, Ghanaian football referee. (death announced on this date)
Gottfried Fischer, 69, German psychologist.
Gene B. Glick, 92, American philanthropist and builder.
Hilton A. Green, 84, American assistant director (Psycho) and producer (Sixteen Candles).
Herbert O. House, 83, American organic chemist.
Herman Hugg, 92, American artist.
Jonathan Kaufer, 58, American film and television writer and director, traffic collision.
Abraham Nemeth, 94, American mathematician and inventor.
Kaare Ørnung, 82, Norwegian pianist and music teacher.
Drita Pelingu, 86, Albanian actress, academic and director, Merited Artist of Albania.
Zdeněk Rytíř, 69, Czech lyricist, heart attack.
Ann Wolpert, 70, American librarian, Director of MIT Libraries (since 1996).

3
Sari Abacha, 34, Nigerian footballer (Kwara United).
Sergei Belov, 69, Russian Olympic champion basketball player (1972), member of the Naismith Hall of Fame and FIBA Hall of Fame.
Trevor Briggs, 67, English rugby league footballer (Castleford).
Lisa Bufano, 40, American performance artist, suicide.
Bob Chance, 73, American baseball player.
Frank D'Rone, 81, American jazz musician, cancer.
Bill Eppridge, 75, American photographer (Life), septic infection.
Mike Gallagher, 72, American Olympic skier.
Edwin Haslam, 81, British chemist.
Masae Kasai, 80, Japanese Olympic champion volleyball player (1964), intracranial hemorrhage.
Helen Klanderud, 76, American politician and psychologist, Mayor of Aspen, Colorado (2001–2007), stroke.
Charlie McBride, 88, New Zealand rugby league player.
Ernie Morgan, 86, English footballer (Gillingham).
John William Potter, 94, American senior judge of the District Court for the Northern District of Ohio (1982–2013), Mayor of Toledo, Ohio (1961–1967).
Ángeles Santos Torroella, 101, Spanish painter.
Milton Schwebel, 99, American psychologist.
Chuck Smith, 86, American pastor (Calvary Chapel Costa Mesa), lung cancer.
Joan Thirsk, 91, British economic and social historian.

4
John Cloudsley-Thompson, 92, British naturalist and army officer.
Ulric Cross, 96, Trinidadian judge, diplomat and war hero.
Akira Miyoshi, 80, Japanese composer, heart failure.
Nicholas Oresko, 96, American World War II veteran, Medal of Honor recipient, complications from surgery.
Harold Rudman, 88, English footballer (Burnley, Rochdale).
Ştefan Stănculescu, 90, Romanian football coach.
Võ Nguyên Giáp, 102, Vietnamese general and politician, Minister of Defence (1976–1980).
Bojan Westin, 87, Swedish actress.
Robert D. Young, 79, American politician.

5
Ruth R. Benerito, 97, American scientist, inventor of wash-and-wear (permanent press) fabrics.
Charles Castle, 74, South African-born British television producer and author.
Erich Cviertna, 62, Czech football player and manager, cancer.
Gaetano Fidanzati, 78, Italian crime boss (Sicilian Mafia).
Hefina Headon, 83, Welsh community and human rights activist.
Hugh Jackson, 95, British paediatrician and child safety campaigner.
Carlo Lizzani, 91, Italian film director, screenwriter and critic, suicide by jumping.
Jim McColl, 80, Australian rules footballer.
Fred Mifflin, 75, Canadian politician and naval officer, MP for Bonavista—Trinity—Conception (1988–2000).
Joe D. Montgomery, 95, American school administrator and politician, member of the Alaska House of Representatives (1979–1983).
Daud Rahbar, 86, Pakistani author and academic.
Yakkun Sakurazuka, 37, Japanese comedian and voice actor (Full Moon o Sagashite, Inazuma Eleven, Zettai Shounen), traffic collision.
Branko Vidović, 91, Croatian Olympic swimmer (1948).
Wang Kenan, 33, Chinese Olympic diver (2004), traffic collision.
Butch Warren, 74, American jazz bassist, lung cancer.

6
Abdul Nasser Bani Hani, Jordanian politician, member of the House of Representatives (2010–2013), shot.
James Leatham Tennant Birley, 85, English psychiatrist.
Ulysses Curtis, 87, American CFL football player (Toronto Argonauts).
Rift Fournier, 77, American writer and producer, cancer.
Paul Gredinger, 85–86, Swiss architect.
Cg'ose Ntcox'o, 62–63, Botswana artist, stroke.
Will Ogdon, 92, American composer and academic.
Paul Rogers, 96, English actor (Our Man in Havana, A Midsummer Night's Dream).
Mary Scales, 85, American academic and politician.
Andy Stewart, 76, British politician, MP for Sherwood (1983–1992).
Nico van Kampen, 92, Dutch theoretical physicist and professor.

7
Mick Buckley, 59, English footballer (Everton, Sunderland).
Terry Burnham, 64, American actress.
Giancarlo Cadé, 83, Italian Olympic football player and coach.
Patrice Chéreau, 68, French film and opera director, lung cancer.
Joanna Chmielewska, 81, Polish novelist and screenwriter.
 Yuri Churbanov, 76, Russian politician, First Deputy Minister of Internal Affairs of the Soviet Union (1980–1983).
 Basil Dickinson, 98, Australian Olympic athlete (1936).
David E. Jeremiah, 79, American admiral, Vice Chairman of the Joint Chiefs of Staff (1990–1994).
Ellen Lanyon, 86, American painter and printmaker.
Dick LaPalm, 85, American music promoter and publicist.
Annette Elizabeth Mahon, 94, Irish aviator.
 Bruce McPherson, 77, South African-born Australian jurist, Queensland Supreme Court Justice (1982–2006).
Leandro Mendoza, 67, Filipino politician, Executive Secretary (2010), Secretary of Transportation and Communications (2002–2010), heart attack.
Donna Norris, 78–79, American baseball player.
Joe Rogers, 49, American politician, Lieutenant Governor of Colorado (1999–2003).
Lars Erik Taxell, 100, Finnish legal scholar, rector of the Åbo Akademi University (1950–1957), leader of the Swedish People's Party of Finland (1955–1966).
Ovadia Yosef, 93, Israeli Chief Rabbi (1973–1983), multiple organ failure.

8
Philip Chevron, 56, Irish musician (The Pogues), esophageal cancer.
David Clark, 94, English cricketer and administrator.
Paul Desmarais, 86, Canadian businessman.
José Faria, 80, Brazilian football coach.
Rod Grams, 65, American politician and television news anchor (KMSP), member of the U.S. House of Representatives (1993–1995) and Senate (1995–2001), cancer.
Helissio, 20, French thoroughbred racehorse, winner of the 1996 Prix de l'Arc de Triomphe, heart attack.
Rodolphe Kasser, 86, Swiss Coptic scholar and archaeologist.
Andy Pafko, 92, American baseball player (Chicago Cubs, Brooklyn Dodgers, Milwaukee Braves).
Stan Paterson, 89, British-born Canadian glaciologist.
Metro Prystai, 85, Canadian ice hockey player (Chicago Blackhawks, Detroit Red Wings).
Akong Rinpoche, 73, Tibetan-born British Buddhist teacher and author, stabbed.
Rottyful Sky, 25, South Korean pop singer, brain tumor.
Khady Sylla, 50, Senegalese writer.
Larry Verne, 77, American singer, Alzheimer's disease.
Elena Volkova, 98, Ukrainian painter.

9
Brandon Bailey, 80, Trinidad and Tobago Olympic weightlifter.
Norma Bengell, 78, Brazilian actress and film director, lung cancer.
Maximiano Tuazon Cruz, 90, Filipino Roman Catholic prelate, Bishop of Calbayog (1994–1999).
Stanley Kauffmann, 97, American author, editor and film critic (The New Republic), pneumonia.
Robert Hugh Molesworth Kindersley, 3rd Baron Kindersley, 84, British aristocrat and businessman.
Jillian Lane, 52, British celebrity psychic, liver disease.
Joop Langhorst, 70, Dutch footballer (Sparta Rotterdam), won KNVB Cup (1966–1967).
Solomon Lar, 80, Nigerian politician, Governor of Plateau State (1979–1983).
António Baltasar Marcelino, 83, Portuguese Roman Catholic prelate, Auxiliary Bishop of Lisbon (1975–1983), Bishop of Aveiro (1988–2006).
Wilfried Martens, 77, Belgian politician, Prime Minister (1979–1981, 1981–1992), pancreatic cancer.
Milan Matulović, 78, Serbian chess grandmaster.
Darris McCord, 80, American football player (Detroit Lions).
Seymour Mullings, 82, Jamaican politician and diplomat, Deputy Prime Minister (1993–2001), Ambassador to the United States (2001–2004).
Edmund Niziurski, 88, Polish author.
Chopper Read, 58, Australian crime figure and author, liver cancer.
Srihari, 49, Indian Tollywood film actor, liver malfunction.
Robert Struckl, 95, Austrian Olympic sprinter.
Monica Turner, 88, English ornithologist.

10
Joop Cabout, 85, Dutch Olympic water polo player (1952) and 1950 European Champion.
Scott Carpenter, 88, American test pilot, astronaut and aquanaut, complications from a stroke.
Edward H. Clarke, 73, American Senior Economist.
Tomoyuki Dan, 50, Japanese actor (Kamen Rider W) and voice actor (Naruto, Mobile Suit Victory Gundam), aortic dissection.
Daniel Duval, 68, French film actor, director and writer.
Joseph Gomer, 93, American pilot (Tuskegee Airman), cancer.
 Jan Kuehnemund, 51, American musician (Vixen), cancer.
Jay Conrad Levinson, 80, American business writer.
Godfrey Lightbourn, 83, Bahamian Olympic sailor.
Walter P. Lomax Jr., 79–80, American medical practitioner.
Norrie Martin, 74, Scottish footballer (Rangers).
Joseph Fielding McConkie, 72, American academic and author.
Sohei Miyashita, 85, Japanese politician.
Emilio Molinero Hurtado, 93, Mexican potter.
Kumar Pallana, 94, Indian actor (The Royal Tenenbaums, The Terminal, Romance & Cigarettes) and vaudeville performer.
Kazem Sarikhani, 35, Iranian Olympic judoka (2000), Asian champion (2000), brain damage.
Herry Janto Setiawan, 40, Indonesian Olympic cyclist.
Jim Shumate, 91, American bluegrass musician.
Cal Smith, 81, American country singer ("The Lord Knows I'm Drinking", "Country Bumpkin").
Antoine Vergote, 91, Belgian priest and theologian.
 Georg Weinhold, 78, German Roman Catholic prelate, Auxiliary Bishop of Dresden-Meissen (1973–2008).
Zheng Tianxiang, 99, Chinese politician and judge, President of the Supreme People's Court (1983–1988).

11
Colleen Bevis, 97, American children's advocate.
 María de Villota, 33, Spanish racing driver, cardiac arrest.
 Wadih El Safi, 91, Lebanese singer-songwriter and actor.
 Margarita Ferrá de Bartol, 78, Argentine politician, member of the Chamber of Deputies for San Juan Province (2009–2013), helicopter crash. 
Stu Gilliam, 80, American actor and comedian.
Christine Jackson, 71, British human rights campaigner, cancer.
Johnny Kovatch, 101, American football player (Cleveland Rams). 
 Erich Priebke, 100, German Nazi SS captain and war criminal.
 Terry Rhoads, 61, American actor (Liar Liar, Hitchcock, The Day After Tomorrow), amyloidosis.
William H. Sullivan, 90, American diplomat, Ambassador to Laos (1964–1969), the Philippines (1973–1977) and Iran (1977–1979).
 Toshio Udō, 87, Japanese writer and critic, pneumonia.

12
Jacques Charland, 83, Canadian Olympic ski jumper.
Glen Dell, 51, South African aerobatics pilot, airshow crash.
George Herbig, 93, American astronomer and academic.
Oscar Hijuelos, 62, American novelist (The Mambo Kings Play Songs of Love), winner of Pulitzer Prize (1990), heart attack.
Eero Koivumäki, 89, Finnish Olympic rower.
Lesław Kropp, 76, Polish Olympic wrestler.
Lin Youren, 75, Chinese musician.
Ulf Linde, 84, Swedish art critic, writer and museum director, member of the Swedish Academy.
Hans Wilhelm Longva, 71, Norwegian diplomat, cancer.
Owe Lostad, 91, Swedish Olympic rower (1960).
Martiens Louw, 75, South African rugby union player, coach and administrator.
Michelle Madoff, 85, Canadian-born American politician, member of the Pittsburgh City Council (1978–1993).
Eduard Martsevich, 76, Soviet and Russian film and theater actor, cirrhosis.
Patsy Norvell, 70–71, American artist.
Malcolm Renfrew, 103, American polymer chemist and inventor.
Mann Rubin, 85, American screenwriter (The First Deadly Sin, The Mod Squad, Barnaby Jones).

13
Olga Aroseva, 87, Russian actress.
Martin Drewes, 94, German military pilot, World War II flying ace.
Augusta Clark, 81, American politician, lawyer and librarian, member of the Philadelphia City Council (1980–2000).
Rosalie Gower, 82, Canadian women's rights advocate, complications of a stroke.
Bob Green, 91, American jazz pianist and bandleader.
Jessica Huntley, 86, Guyanese-born British publisher.
Dottie Berger MacKinnon, 71, American children's advocate.
Joe Meriweather, 59, American basketball player (Kansas City Kings).
Angela Moldovan, 86, Romanian singer and actress (Veronica), Order of the Star of Romania recipient, cardiac arrest.
Tatsuo Ozawa, 96, Japanese politician (Minister of Welfare).
Mario Picone, 87, American baseball player (New York Giants, Cincinnati Redlegs).
Graham Reynolds, 99, British art historian.
Philippos Syrigos, 65, Greek sports journalist, cancer.
David Thomson, 88, Australian politician, member of the House of Representatives (1975–1983).
Tommy Whittle, 87, British jazz saxophonist, pneumonia.
Takashi Yanase, 94, Japanese cartoonist (Anpanman), heart failure.

14
 Wally Bell, 48, American baseball umpire, heart attack.
José Borello, 83, Argentine footballer.
Max Cahner, 76, Spanish Catalan politician and writer.
 James Joseph Daly, 92, American Roman Catholic prelate, Auxiliary Bishop of Rockville Centre (1977–1996).
Bob Elliott, 85, Canadian politician and scientist. 
 Kōichi Iijima, 83, Japanese poet, malabsorption syndrome.
Josef Majer, 88, Czechoslovak football player.
 Pauke Meijers, 79, Dutch footballer (Feyenoord), Alzheimer's disease.
 Bruno Metsu, 59, French football player and coach (Senegal, United Arab Emirates), colorectal cancer.
 Käty van der Mije-Nicolau, 73, Romanian-born Dutch chess grandmaster, cardiac arrest.
 Frank Moore, 67, American performance artist, pleural pneumonia.
 Ryōzō Nagashima, 77, Japanese editor and translator, heart failure.
 Maxine Powell, 98, American etiquette instructor (Motown).

15
Tommy Andersson, 50, Swedish actor.
Donald Bailey, 80, American jazz drummer.
Ian Douglas-Wilson, 101, British physician and editor (The Lancet).
Nevill Drury, 66, English-born Australian author and publisher, liver failure.
 Sean Edwards, 26, British racing driver, racetrack collision.
*El Brazo, 52, Mexican professional wrestler, complications of diabetes.
Rudolf Friedrich, 90, Swiss politician, member of the Federal Council (1982–1984).
Cancio Garcia, 75, Filipino jurist, Associate Justice of the Supreme Court (2004–2007), heart attack.
Harry Hughes, 84, English professional footballer.
 Arsala Jamal, 47, Afghan provincial governor, bombing.
 Eugène Georges Joseph Lecrosnier, 90, French Roman Catholic prelate, Bishop of Belfort-Montbéliard (1979–2000).
 Jack Lynn, 86, British architect.
 Gloria Lynne, 83, American jazz vocalist, heart attack.
Rudy Minarcin, 83, American baseball player (Cincinnati Redlegs, Boston Red Sox).
George Olesen, 88, American comic strip artist (The Phantom).
Gustav Ranis, 83, American economist and emeritus professor at Yale.
Hans Riegel, 90, German entrepreneur (Haribo).
Rodolfo Rivademar, 85, Argentine Olympic silver-medalist sailor (1948).
Pat Ryan, 61, New Zealand boxer.
Reiner Schilling, 70, German Olympic wrestler.

16
Albert Bourlon, 96, French racing cyclist.
Govind Purushottam Deshpande, 74, Indian playwright and academic.
Charles Halton, 81, British-born Australian mathematician and civil servant.
George Hourmouziadis, 81, Greek archaeologist.
Ed Lauter, 74, American actor (The Artist, The Rocketeer, Not Another Teen Movie), mesothelioma.
Kate Losinska, 81, British trade unionist.
Laurel Martyn, 97, Australian ballerina and choreographer. 
Robert Rheault, 87, American army officer (Project GAMMA).
Samuel Reid Spencer Jr., 94, American academic administrator.
Aurelia Szőke-Tudor, 78, Romanian world champion handball player (1962).
Saggy Tahir, 68, Indian-born American politician, natural causes.
David Frederick Wertz, 97, American prelate, Bishop of the United Methodist Church.
Ye Duzheng, 97, Chinese meteorologist.

17
George A. Blair, 98, American businessman, entrepreneur and waterskier.
Henry C. Boren, 92, American historian.
Antonia Brenner, 86, American nun.
Giorgio Dellagiovanna, 72, Italian footballer.
Terry Fogerty, 69, British rugby league player.
Ronald Frankish, 90, Australian cricketer.
Giant George, 7, American Great Dane, world's tallest dog.
Guardian Sein Win, 91, Burmese journalist and advocate of freedom of the press.
Antonio Guidi, 85, Italian actor and voice actor.
Jameh Jameh, 58–59, Syrian general, shot.
Arthur Maxwell House, 87, Canadian neurologist and politician, Lieutenant-Governor of Newfoundland and Labrador (1997–2002).
Harbhajan Singh Rissam, 62, Indian cardiologist.
Lou Scheimer, 84, American television producer (He-Man, Fat Albert, Star Trek: The Animated Series), co-founder of Filmation, Parkinson's disease.
Rene Simpson, 47, Canadian tennis player, brain cancer.
Take Control, 6, American Thoroughbred racehorse, euthanized.
Erica Vaal, 85–86, Austrian actress, writer, radio host and presenter.
Sarojini Varadappan, 92, Indian social worker.

18
Francisco Rafael Arellano Félix, 63, Mexican drug lord, shot.
Ravuri Bharadhwaja, 86, Indian Telugu language writer.
Mary Carver, 89, American actress (The Shadow Box, Simon & Simon).
Felix Dexter, 52, British comedian (The Real McCoy), multiple myeloma.
Charlie Dickson, 79, Scottish footballer (Dunfermline Athletic).
Mac Elvis, 25, Ugandan gospel musician and music producer, drowning.
Tom Foley, 84, American politician and diplomat, Speaker of the House of Representatives (1989–1995), Ambassador to Japan (1997–2001), complications from a stroke.
Norman Geras, 70, British political theorist and author, emeritus professor of politics (University of Manchester).
Michael Harvey, 82, British lettering artist.
Roland Janes, 80, American rockabilly guitarist and record producer.
Robert Mazer, 90, American industrialist, Chicago White Sox owner.
Marie McDonough, 95, Australian cricketer.
Bum Phillips, 90, American football coach (Houston Oilers, New Orleans Saints).
Alexander James Quinn, 81, American Roman Catholic prelate, Auxiliary Bishop of Cleveland (1983–2008).
Charles A. Sorber, 74, American civil engineer, engineering professor, and academic administrator.
Allan Stanley, 87, Canadian Hall of Fame ice hockey player, four-time Stanley Cup winner (1962, 1963, 1964, 1967).
Bill Young, 82, American politician, member of the House of Representatives from Florida (since 1971), complications from back injury.

19
John Bergamo, 73, American percussionist and composer.
Georges Descrières, 83, French actor (Arsène Lupin), cancer.
Vladimir Eljanov, 62, Ukrainian chess master and trainer.
Hilda Hänchen, 94, German physicist. 
Manuel Haro, 82, Spanish footballer.
Noel Harrison, 79, British singer ("The Windmills of Your Mind"), actor (The Girl From U.N.C.L.E.) and Olympic skier, heart attack.
Ronald Shannon Jackson, 73, American percussionist, leukemia.
Vladimir Keilis-Borok, 92, Russian mathematical geophysicist and seismologist.
Zubaida Khanum, 78, Pakistani singer.
Kurt Kurz, 86, Austrian Olympic ice hockey player.
Jon Locke, 86, American actor (Land of the Lost), complications from a stroke.
William C. Lowe, 72, American businessman, involved in development of IBM PC.
Rosario Martinelli, 72, Italian professional football player.
Nosratollah Momtahen, 89, Iranian Olympic sport shooter.
Jakkrit Panichpatikum, 40, Thai sport shooter, shot.
Y. Radhakrishnamurthy, 85, Indian politician, member of the Rajya Sabha (1996–2002).
K. Raghavan, 99, Indian Malayalam film music composer.
Mikihiko Renjō, 65, Japanese novelist, cancer.
Geoff Smith, 85, English footballer (Bradford City).
Viktor Tsybulenko, 83, Ukrainian Olympic champion javelin thrower (1960).
Mahmoud Zoufonoun, 93, Iranian traditional musician, Alzheimer's disease.

20
Yukichi Amano, 80, Japanese columnist, interstitial lung disease.
Leon Ashley, 77, American country music singer.
Bruce Beeby, 91, Australian actor (Journey into Space).
Thomas Blondeau, 35, Flemish writer and poet, aortic rupture.
Jovanka Broz, 88, Yugoslav army officer, First Lady (1953–1980), widow of Josip Broz Tito.
Dullahan, 4, American Thoroughbred racehorse, euthanized.
Dimiter Gotscheff, 70, German theatre director.
Stephen S. Gottlieb, 77, American politician, heart failure.
Bernardo Filipe Governo, 74, Mozambican Roman Catholic prelate, Bishop of Quelimane (1976–2007).
Martin Greenberg, 95, American book publisher.
Don James, 80, American football coach (University of Washington), pancreatic cancer.
David Jimenez, 74, Puerto Rican American professional golfer, Alzheimer's disease.
Jamalul Kiram III, 75, Filipino politician, claimant to the Sultanate of Sulu, multiple organ failure.
Lawrence Klein, 93, American economist, predicted post-World War II economic boom, laureate of Nobel Prize in Economic Sciences (1980).
Nikolai B. Kopnin, 67, Russian physicist.
Alain Lascoux, 69, French mathematician.
Kurt Lindlgruber, 78, Austrian sprint canoeist.
Michael Locke, 84, English-born Canadian biologist.
Émile Louis, 79, French murderer.
Vallachira Madhavan, 79, Malayalam novelist and short story writer.
Herman Makkink, 75, Dutch sculptor, graphic artist and illustrator.
Ray Martynuik, 63, Canadian ice hockey player.
 Imre Nagy, 80, Hungarian Olympic champion modern pentathlete (1960).
Pierre Page, 86, Swiss Olympic athlete.
Warner R. Schilling, 88, American political scientist.
Joginder Singh, 81, Kenyan rally driver.
Bobby Thomas, 80, American jazz drummer.
Larri Thomas, 81, American actress (Million Dollar Mermaid, The Silencers, Love Me or Leave Me), fall.
Sid Yudain, 90, American journalist, founder of Roll Call.
Dmitri Zaikin, 81, Russian engineer and cosmonaut trainer.

21
Bud Adams, 90, American businessman, owner of the Tennessee Titans, natural causes.
Aldo Bolzan, 80, Luxembourgian cyclist.
Gianni Ferrio, 88, Italian composer, conductor and music arranger.
Keryn Jordan, 37, South African footballer (Auckland City), cancer.
Munawwar Ali Khan, 88, Pakistani cricketer.
Mohammed Vizarat Rasool Khan, 66, Indian educationalist and politician.
Rune T. Kidde, 56, Danish writer, storyteller, musician and artist.
Frank Lima, 74, American poet.
Irma Lozano, 69, Mexican actress, mouth cancer.
Stuart McGee, 72–73, Irish priest.
Colonel Robert Morris, 58, American musician, complications of a heart attack.
Major Owens, 77, American politician, member of the House of Representatives for New York (1983–2007).
Bohdan Przywarski, 81, Polish Olympic basketball player.
Jackie Rea, 92, Northern Irish snooker player.
Kanjuro Shibata XX, 92, Japanese bowmaker and kyūdō teacher.
Karl Sim, 89, New Zealand artist and art forger.
Karen Sogn, 82, Norwegian politician, member of the Storting from Vestfold (1977–1985).
Dick van den Polder, 79, Dutch footballer (S.B.V. Excelsior).
Oscar Yanes, 86, Venezuelan author.

22
Oriol Bohigas Martí, 75, Spanish and French physicist.
Mark Clarke, 63, Caymanian Olympic sailor.
Marylou Dawes, 80, Canadian concert pianist.
Lajos Für, 82, Hungarian politician and historian, Minister of Defence (1990–1994).
William Harrison, 79, American author and screenwriter (Rollerball), kidney failure.
Hou Renzhi, 101, Chinese geographer.
Joseph H. Hulse, 90, Canadian biochemist, food technologist and writer.
Théophile Georges Kassab, 68, Syrian Syriac Catholic hierarch, Archbishop of Homs (since 2000).
Yanwari Kazama, 36, Japanese cartoonist, liver failure.
Antonio Márquez Ramírez, 77, Mexican football referee.
Shizuka Murayama, 94, Japanese-French painter.
Kadir Özcan, 61, Turkish football player and coach, cardiac arrest.
James Robinson Risner, 88, American airman.
Nauman Shabbir, 59, Pakistani cricketer.
Mark Small, 45, American baseball player (Houston Astros).
Piotr Wala, 76, Polish Olympic ski-jumper.

23
Suleiman Arabiyat, 74–75, Jordanian academic and politician, Agriculture Minister (1989–1990).
Wes Bialosuknia, 68, American basketball player (University of Connecticut, Oakland Oaks).
Anthony Joseph Burgess, 75, Australian Roman Catholic prelate, Bishop of Wewak (2002−2013).
Sir Anthony Caro, 89, British sculptor, heart attack.
Bjørn Christoffersen, 86, Norwegian rower.
Niall Donohue, 22, Irish hurler (Galway), suicide.
Adrian Ettlinger, 88, American electrical engineer.
John T. Gregorio, 85, American politician, member of the New Jersey General Assembly (1976−1978) and Senate (1978−1983), Mayor of Linden (1990−2006), leukemia.
Dolores Lambaša, 32, Croatian actress, injuries sustained in traffic collision.
Charles Letts, 95, English entrepreneur.
E. Raymond Lynch, 90, American politician, member of the Pennsylvania House of Representatives (1979−1980). 
Gypie Mayo, 62, English rock guitarist (Dr. Feelgood, The Yardbirds) and songwriter ("Milk and Alcohol").
Bill Mazer, 92, American sportscaster.
Ettore Perego, 100, Italian Olympic gymnast (1948).
Esteban Siller, 82, Mexican voice actor.
Edward Thorne, 89, New Zealand navy chief of staff.

24
Antonia Bird, 62, English television drama and film director, thyroid cancer.
Manna Dey, 94, Indian playback singer, respiratory illness and renal failure.
Manolo Escobar, 82, Spanish singer and actor.
Brooke Greenberg, 20, American woman with rare slow-aging condition, bronchomalacia.
Ben Haden, 88, American televangelist, broadcaster and CIA operative.
Ana Bertha Lepe, 79, Mexican actress, Miss Mexico (1953).
Boris Magaš, 83, Croatian architect and academic.
Arthur Maling, 90,  American author. 
Lew Mayne, 93, American football player.
Raymond Mwanyika, 83, Tanzanian Roman Catholic prelate, Bishop of Njombe (1971−2002).
Kadir Nurman, 80, Turkish-born German restaurateur, credited with inventing the doner kebab.
Augusto Odone, 80, Italian economist and medical pioneer (Lorenzo's oil).
Ebbe Parsner, 91, Danish Olympic rower (1948, 1952).
Reggie Rogers, 49, American football player (Detroit Lions), cocaine and alcohol intoxication.
Nyanasamvara Suvaddhana, 100, Thai Buddhist monk, Supreme Patriarch of Thailand (since 1989).
Henry Taylor, 80, English racing driver.
Deborah Turbeville, 81, American fashion photographer, lung cancer.
Zuzzurro, 67, Italian actor and comedian, lung cancer.

25
Ron Ackland, 78, New Zealand rugby league player and coach.
Pauline M. Clerk, 78, Ghanaian civil servant, natural causes.
Jenny Dalenoord, 95, Dutch illustrator of children's books and cartoon artist.
Arthur Danto, 89, American philosopher and art critic.
Nigel Davenport, 85, English actor (Chariots of Fire, Howards' Way).
Friedrich Fetz, 85, Austrian Olympic gymnast.
Roy Grantham, 86, British trade unionist, General Secretary of APEX (1971–1989).
Bill Gulick, 97, American author and historian.
Sir Nicholas Hunt, 82, British admiral.
Tokiko Iwatani, 97, Japanese lyricist, pneumonia.
Arne Johansen, 86, Norwegian Olympic speed skater (1952).
Dan Laksov, 73, Norwegian mathematician and human rights activist.
Piero Mazzarella, 85, Italian actor.
Tommy McConville, 67, Irish footballer.
Paddy McFarlane, 81, New Zealand footballer.
Ray Melikian, 95, American fighter pilot.
Peter Mitterer, 66, Austrian politician, Senator (2005–2013), President of the Federal Council (2005, 2010).
Hal Needham, 82, American stuntman and film director (Smokey and the Bandit, The Cannonball Run), cancer.
Paul Reichmann, 83, Canadian businessman and real estate mogul (Olympia and York).
Bill Sharman, 87, American Hall of Fame basketball player (Boston Celtics) and coach (Los Angeles Lakers), complications from a stroke.
Lawrence Leighton Smith, 77, American conductor and pianist.
Amparo Soler Leal, 80, Spanish actress, cardiac arrest.
Sir William Tyree, 81, Australian engineer and businessman.
Piero Tiberi, 66, Italian actor and voice actor.
Chico Vaughn, 73, American basketball player (St. Louis Hawks, Detroit Pistons), cancer.
Marcia Wallace, 70, American actress (The Simpsons, The Bob Newhart Show) and comedian, pneumonia.

26
Ritva Arvelo, 92, Finnish actress, director and screenwriter.
Gias Kamal Chowdhury, 74, Bangladeshi journalist.
Ron Davies, 91, Welsh photographer.
Denis Foley, 79, Irish politician, Teachta Dála (1981−1989, 1992−2002), Senator (1989−1992).
 Gabriel of Komana, 67, Belgian-born French Orthodox archbishop, cancer.
Elza Furtado Gomide, 88,  Brazilian mathematician.
Doug Ireland, 67, American journalist and blogger.
Al Johnson, 65, American soul singer (The Unifics).
P. S. Manisundaram, 85, Indian academic.
Andries Maseko, 58, South African footballer.
Michael Neuberger, 59, British biochemist, myeloma.
Points Offthebench, 4, American Thoroughbred racehorse, euthanized.

27
Aldo Barbero, 76, Argentine actor.
Julian Bennett, 84, American politician.
Vinko Coce, 59, Croatian singer, complications from diabetes.
Fred Creba, 68, New Zealand Paralympic sportsperson.
Noel Davern, 67, Irish politician, Teachta Dála (1969−1981, 1987−2007), Member of the European Parliament (1979−1984), Minister for Education (1991−1992).
Eddie Erautt, 89, American baseball player (Cincinnati Reds/Redlegs, St. Louis Cardinals).
Olga Gyarmati, 89, Hungarian Olympic athlete (1948).
Basil Hennessy, 88, Australian archaeologist.
Leonard Herzenberg, 81, American immunologist and geneticist.
F. Landa Jocano, 83, Filipino anthropologist.
Luigi Magni, 85, Italian screenwriter and film director.
Michael Mandel, 65, Canadian legal academic.
Roger McGee, 86, American actor (Forbidden Planet).
Darryn Randall, 32, South African cricketer (Border), head trauma.
Lou Reed, 71, American rock musician (The Velvet Underground) and songwriter ("Walk on the Wild Side"), liver disease.
Nir Shamsher Jang Bahadur Rana, 99, Nepalese field marshal.
Albie Thomas, 78, Australian Olympic runner and world record holder.
Sir Michael Wilkes, 73, British army general, Lieutenant Governor of Jersey (1995–2001).

28
Nalini Ambady, 54, Indian social psychologist, leukemia.
Adolphus Bell, 69, American electric blues musician, lung cancer.
Bonfire, 30, German Olympic champion dressage horse (2000), euthanized following adrenal disease and hoof inflammation.
Troy Clarke, 44, Australian football player, coronary atherosclerosis.
Trygve Fjetland, 87, Norwegian businessperson.
Marea Gazzard, 85, Australian sculptor and ceramicist.
Tommy Gumina, 82, American jazz accordionist and musical instrument builder.
Ferdinand Havlík, 85, Czech clarinetist and composer, co-founder of Semafor.
Tetsuharu Kawakami, 93, Japanese baseball player and manager (Yomiuri Giants).
Eunice Kazembe, 61, Malawian politician, Minister of Industry and Trade (2009–2012), Minister for Education (since 2012).
Tadashi Maeda, 66, Japanese politician, member of the House of Representatives (1990–1993, 1996–2000), heart failure.
Tadeusz Mazowiecki, 86, Polish politician, Prime Minister (1989–1991), member of the Sejm (1961–1972, 1991–2001).
Layne Redmond, 61, American drummer and author, breast cancer.
Ike Skelton, 81, American politician, member of the House of Representatives from Missouri (1977–2011), pneumonia.
Aleksandar Tijanić, 64, Serbian journalist, general director of Radio Television of Serbia, heart attack.
Rajendra Yadav, 84, Indian Hindi fiction writer.
Mária Zalai-Kövi, 89, Hungarian Olympic gymnast.

29
Allal Ben Kassou, 71, Moroccan Olympic footballer (FAR Rabat).
Jaime Casagrande, 64, Brazilian footballer (Figueirense).
Jean Rénald Clérismé, 75, Haitian politician, diplomat and priest, Foreign Minister (2006–2008).
Stephen H. Crandall, 92, American mechanical engineer and academic.
Sherman Halsey, 56, American music video director.
Rudolf Kehrer, 90, Georgian-born German classical pianist.
Ferdie le Grange, 65, South African plastic surgeon and marathon runner.
Martha Longenecker, 93, American artist and academic, founded Mingei International Museum.
Srđa Popović, 76, Serbian civil rights lawyer and activist.
Sheikh Salahuddin, 44, Bangladeshi cricketer, cardiac arrest.
John-David Schofield, 75, American Anglican prelate, Bishop of San Joaquin (1988–2011).
João Rodrigo Silva Santos, 35, Brazilian footballer (Bangu, Östers, Madureira), murdered.
John Spence, 95, American World War II veteran, first combat frogman (diver).
Graham Stark, 91, English comedian and actor (The Pink Panther, Superman III, Alfie), stroke.
Jan van de Ven, 88, Dutch politician, member of the House of Representatives (1976–1981).
Wong Kim Poh, 79, Singaporean Olympic basketballer.

30
Max Bléneau, 79, French cyclist.
Lincoln P. Bloomfield, 93, American academic.
Edward Chupa, 95, American football player and coach.
Bill Currie, 84, American baseball player (Washington Senators).
Leo Gravelle, 88, Canadian ice hockey player (Montreal Canadiens).
Pete Haycock, 62, English guitarist (Climax Blues Band), heart attack.
Marilyn E. Jacox, 84, American physicist.
Dave MacFarlane, 46, Scottish footballer (Rangers, Kilmarnock).
Ray Mielczarek, 67, Welsh footballer (Wrexham).
*Joaquín José Morón Hidalgo, 71, Venezuelan Roman Catholic prelate, Bishop of Valle de la Pascua (1992−2002) and Acarigua-Araure (since 2002), cancer.
Michael Palmer, 71, American novelist, heart attack and stroke.
Anca Petrescu, 64, Romanian architect and politician, MP (2004–2008), chief architect of the Palace of the Parliament, complications following traffic collision.
J. R. Salamanca, 90, American author and academic. 
Frank Wess, 91, American jazz saxophonist and flautist, heart attack.

31
April, 30, Belizean zoo tapir.
John Benetti, 76, Australian rules footballer.
Bruno Bertagna, 78, Italian Roman Catholic archbishop, Secretary (1994−2007) and Vice-President of Council for Legislative Texts (2007−2010).
Toby Bluth, 73, American artist and animator (Alvin & the Chipmunks, The Smurfs).
Walter Brown, 86, New Zealand actor.
Radha Burnier, 89, Indian theosophist leader.
Murray Cardiff, 79, Canadian politician.
Chris Chase, 90, American actress (Killer's Kiss, All That Jazz), pancreatic cancer.
Evelyn de Mille, 94, Canadian bookseller.
Gérard de Villiers, 83, French thriller writer (Son Altesse Sérénissime), pancreatic cancer.
Jagadish Ghimire, 67, Nepalese writer and development worker, cancer.
Robert Gray, 68, American actor (Innerspace).
Trees Huberts-Fokkelman, 79, Dutch politician, member of the Senate (1991–1995).
Trevor Kletz, 91, British chemical engineer and safety consultant. 
Johnny Kucks, 80, American baseball player (New York Yankees, Kansas City Athletics), cancer.
Henryk Markiewicz, 90, Polish historian.
William Morris, 88, British Church of Scotland minister and author.
Andres Narvasa, 84, Filipino lawyer and jurist, Chief Justice of the Supreme Court (1991−1998), pneumonia.
Bobby Parker, 76, American blues-rock guitarist.
K. P. Saxena, 81, Indian satirist and writer.
Charles Suckling, 93, British biochemist.

References

2013-10
 10